Little Lake Bonny, (sometimes spelled Little Lake Bonnie) is a lake in Polk County, Florida, in the United States. The lake is a part of the Peace River - Saddle Creek Watershed. The lake lies at the Southeast corner of the much larger Lake Bonny. Some believe these lakes derive their name from the bony fish caught in the lake, while others say the lake's name honors a local pioneer with the name Boney. The lake borders Southeastern University and the Lake-to-Lake Trail.

Little Lake Bonny is usually conjoined with Lake Bonny on its southeastern corner, except in periods of drought.

References

Bonny
Lakes of Florida